The Improv Bandits are an improvisational theatre group in Auckland, New Zealand. They have performed with renowned improvisors Wayne Brady and Colin Mochrie, as well as voice actor Dan Castellaneta. The Improv Bandits were formed by Wade Jackson, and have been described in the New Zealand Herald as "one of New Zealand's most successful comedy ventures".

History 

Formed in 1997, the group initially performed at the Silo Theatre. They subsequently established and performed at their own theatre, the Covert Theatre, until it closed in 2005.

To celebrate their twentieth anniversary in 2017, the group performed a show with renowned Whose Line Is It Anyway? improvisor Colin Mochrie.

See also 

 List of improvisational theatre companies

References

External links 
Improv Bandits

Improvisational troupes
Culture in Auckland